The 2019–20 Premier League Cup was the seventh edition of the competition. The defending champions were Everton, who won the 2018–19 competition. This edition of the tournament did not crown a champion as it was cancelled at the Round of 16 stage, due to the COVID-19 Pandemic in the United Kingdom.

Participants

Category 1
Aston Villa
Birmingham City
Blackburn Rovers
Burnley
Crystal Palace
Derby County
Everton
Leeds United
Liverpool
Newcastle United
Nottingham Forest
Middlesbrough
Reading
Southampton
Stoke City
Sunderland
West Bromwich Albion
Wolverhampton Wanderers

Category 2 
AFC Bournemouth
Charlton Athletic
Colchester United
Doncaster Rovers
Fulham
Hull City
Swansea City
Watford

Category 3 
Bristol Rovers
Cambridge United
Exeter City
Fleetwood Town
Huddersfield Town
Newport County
Oxford United
Plymouth Argyle
Portsmouth
Scunthorpe United
Shrewsbury Town
Southend United
Wigan Athletic
Yeovil Town

Qualifying round 
A qualifying round was required to finalise the 32 teams that would enter the Group Stage.

Group stage 
Teams play each other twice, with the group winners and runners–up advance to the round of 16.

Group A

Group B

Group C

Group D

Group E

Group F

Group G

Group H

Knockout stages

Round of 16

See also 

 2019–20 Professional U23 Development League
 2019–20 FA Youth Cup

References 

2019–20 in English football
Premier League Cup (football)
Premier League Cup